Felix Airways Limited, also known as Al Saeeda, (both meaning "Happy," from the Roman term for Yemen, Arabia Felix) is a regional airline based in Sana'a, Yemen.

History
The airline was established in 2008 as a subsidiary of flag carrier Yemenia by the Islamic Bank for Development, to serve the growing market for low-cost travel in the region. In late October 2008, Felix Airways began domestic operations with CRJ 700 aircraft, and expanded both domestically and regionally.

Operations have been severely disrupted since 2015 due to the ongoing military conflict affecting its hub at Sana'a International Airport. From 2015 the airline, in common with the entire Yemeni tourist industry, suffered a near-complete reduction in activity due to the conflict and the siege in the region; Felix Airways flights were reported (in April 2019) to have declined from 55 to only 3 weekly flights. The airline originally also had two Bombardier CRJ700s, but one was destroyed by bombing at Sana'a International Airport in April 2015.

Destinations

Current destinations
As of February 2021, Felix Airways serves the following scheduled destinations:

Djibouti
Djibouti - Djibouti–Ambouli International Airport

Yemen
Aden - Aden International Airport 
Seiyun - Sayun Airport
Socotra - Socotra Airport

United Arab Emirates
Dubai - Dubai International Airport

Former destinations
As of January 2015 (before the air blockade), Felix Airways served the following destinations:

Fleet
As of February 2021, the Felix Airways fleet included the following aircraft:

References

External links
Official website

Airlines of Yemen
Low-cost carriers
Airlines established in 2008
2008 establishments in Yemen